William Ryan (21 September 1921 – 2 January 1994) was an Irish Fianna Fáil politician from County Tipperary. He was a senator from 1961 to 1989.

Born in Kilfeacle, County Tipperary, Ryan was elected in 1961 to the 10th Seanad on the Agricultural Panel. He was re-elected eight times, until he stood down at the 1989 election to the 19th Seanad.

Ryan also stood as a Fianna Fáil candidate for Dáil Éireann in the Tipperary South constituency at three  successive general elections: 1965, 1969, 1973. He was unsuccessful on each occasion.

References

1921 births
1994 deaths
Fianna Fáil senators
Members of the 10th Seanad
Members of the 11th Seanad
Members of the 12th Seanad
Members of the 13th Seanad
Members of the 14th Seanad
Members of the 15th Seanad
Members of the 16th Seanad
Members of the 17th Seanad
Members of the 18th Seanad
Politicians from County Tipperary
Irish farmers